Club MTV Party To Go volume 1 was the first album in the MTV Party To Go series.  The album was certified Gold on May 25, 1994 by the RIAA.

Track listing
At the Club (Club MTV Theme)
Turn This Mutha Out – MC Hammer
Poison – Bell Biv DeVoe
Feels Good – Tony! Toni! Toné!
Knocked Out – Paula Abdul
Think – Information Society
Play That Funky Music – Vanilla Ice
Tom's Diner – DNA featuring Suzanne Vega
Knockin' Boots – Candyman
The Humpty Dance – Digital Underground
Don't Wanna Fall in Love – Jane Child
Personal Jesus – Depeche Mode

MTV series albums
1991 compilation albums
Tommy Boy Records compilation albums
Dance-pop compilation albums